Sonya Melissa Isaacs (born July 22, 1974) is an American country, bluegrass gospel and Christian music singer. Isaacs grew up near Morrow, Ohio, and graduated from Little Miami High School in 1992. Her maternal  grandparents are Polish Jewish Holocaust survivors and were liberated from a concentration camp in Germany in 1945.

She has released one album on Lyric Street Records, and has charted five singles on the Billboard Hot Country Songs charts. Three were included on her self-titled debut album, released in 2000. A fourth was a Christmas single included on the label's multi-artist collection No Wrapping Required: A Christmas Album. Her highest-charting single, "No Regrets Yet", peaked at number 36 on the country charts but did not appear on an album.

She parted ways with Lyric Street in 2004. Isaacs, along with several of her family members, also comprise a gospel music band called The Isaacs. Sonya recorded the song "The Battlefield" for the soundtrack to the 2006 film Broken Bridges. She and Vince Gill contributed guest vocals to a cover of "Misty" on Cledus T. Judd's 2007 tribute album Boogity, Boogity – A Tribute to the Comedic Genius of Ray Stevens.

She also sang a duet with Dolly Parton to "The Angels Rejoiced".

Isaacs married singer-songwriter Jimmy Yeary on December 20, 2009, with whom she co-wrote Martina McBride's 2011 single "I'm Gonna Love You Through It".

Isaacs and Yeary have two sons born in 2011 and 2015, and a daughter born in 2017.

As a member of The Isaacs, Isaacs became a member of the Grand Ole Opry in 2021.

Discography

Albums

Singles

Other charted songs

Music videos

References

External links
 Official website of the Isaacs
 The Fishman Isaacs Israel Initiative

1974 births
American women country singers
American country singer-songwriters
Living people
Lyric Street Records artists
Singer-songwriters from Tennessee
Southern gospel performers
People from LaFollette, Tennessee
21st-century American singers
21st-century American women singers
Country musicians from Tennessee